Saule Maratovna Karibayeva (Säule Kärıbaeva; born 23 April 1987) is a Kazakhstani women's football striker currently playing for BIIK Shymkent in the Kazakhstani Championship. She has also played the Champions League with Alma KTZh, and she has been a member of the Kazakhstani national team since debuting at 17 in 2004.

References

1987 births
Living people
Women's association football forwards
Kazakhstani women's footballers
Sportspeople from Almaty
Kazakhstan women's international footballers
BIIK Kazygurt players